Emil Noll (born 21 November 1978) is a German-Congolese former professional footballer who played as a centre-back.

Career
Noll was born in Kinshasa, Zaire. He played in the Bundesliga and the UEFA Cup with Alemannia Aachen. In April 2009, was linked with a transfer to Leeds United and Sheffield Wednesday.

In August 2010, he joined Arka Gdynia on a two-year contract. He was released by Arka Gdynia on 30 June 2011.

In August 2011, he joined Pogoń Szczecin.

Personal life
Noll's father is German and his mother is Congolese, his family moved to Ulm, Germany when he was five years old.

References

External links
 
 

Living people
1978 births
German sportspeople of Democratic Republic of the Congo descent
German footballers
Footballers from Kinshasa
Association football defenders
Bundesliga players
2. Bundesliga players
Ekstraklasa players
VfR Aalen players
Alemannia Aachen players
TuS Koblenz players
SC Paderborn 07 players
FSV Frankfurt players
Arka Gdynia players
Pogoń Szczecin players
FC 08 Homburg players
FV Ravensburg players
German expatriate footballers
German expatriate sportspeople in Liechtenstein
Expatriate footballers in Liechtenstein
German expatriate sportspeople in Poland
Expatriate footballers in Poland